Caucho may refer to:
 Natural rubber
 Caucho Technology, an information technology company based in San Diego, USA